Rapid Action Battalion or RAB, is an anti-crime and anti-terrorism unit of the Bangladesh Police. This elite force consists of members of the Bangladesh Army, Bangladesh Police, Bangladesh Navy, Bangladesh Air Force, Border Guard Bangladesh, Bangladesh Civil Service and Bangladesh Ansar. It was formed on 26 March 2004 as RAT (Rapid Action Team), and commenced operations on 14 April 2004. From 2004 to 2008 RAB had killed 1,062 people.

The Rapid Action Battalion has been criticized by rights groups for its use of extrajudicial killings and is accused of forced disappearances.

History

2003-2008 
Rapid Action Battalion was formed on 12 July 2003 under the Armed Police Battalion (Amendment) Act, 2003. The act was passed through the amendment of Armed Forces Battalion Ordinance 1979 which provides immunity to RAB officers for actions taken in the course of their duty. Each battalion of Rapid Action Battalion is commanded by Additional Deputy Inspector General rank officer or its equivalent in other forces. RAB cannot file cases with courts themselves but must be forward the cases to Bangladesh Police who will file the case with the court. RAB is composed of personnel from Bangladesh military and law enforcement agencies who return to their own units after service with RAB ends.

RAB replaced the short lived Rapid Action Team (RAT) which was formed in January 2003. RAB has faced criticism for alleged extrajudicial killings from its formation. In an editorial on 23 July 2004 The Daily Star wrote "reign it in before it turns into a [RABid] monster." RAB was provided weapons seized from 10-Truck Arms and Ammunition Haul in Chittagong on 16 April 2004. RAB has a media centre in Karwan Bazar.

On 15 July 2004, RAB arrested Sumon Ahmed Majumder, a Jubo League leader and garment trader, in Tongi. He died within 10 hours of being arrested from torture at RAB headquarters in Uttara. He was a witness to the murder of Ahsanullah Master, member of parliament from Awami League. Police claimed he died while resisting arrest while RAB claimed he was lynched by the general public. Police refused to take a complaint from his father.

On 30 May 2005, RAB arrested Abul Kalam Azad Sumon, a tailor and Bangladesh Chhattra League activist, from Dhaka along with two others. He was killed soon after. He had been shot six times and his body showed signs of torture. According to his mother, Sumon had switched from Bangladesh Nationalist Party to Awami League which angered his local member of parliament Mirza Abbas.

On 8 March 2006, RAB detained Md. Masudur Rahman, a businessman and activist of Jubo League, from Dhaka. His body was found with signs of torture and bullet wounds the next day.

On 24 January 2007, journalist Jahangir Alam Akash was detained and tortured by RAB-5 in Rajshahi by Major Rashidul Hassan Rashid.

On 15 July 2008, Moshiul Alam Sentu of Bangladesh Jatiotabadi Chatra Dal was detained by Rapid Action Battalion from Dhaka and his body was found the next day in a paddy field in Barisal. According to RAB he died in a crossfire; his body showed signs of torture. Dr. Mizanur Rahman Tutul, leader of the insurgent Purbo Banglar Communist Party, was detained on 26 July and his body was recovered the next day.

2009-2018 
Shafique Ahmed, Minister of Law, defended RAB to Human Rights Watch by saying RAB only killed criminals in 2009. On May 28, Moshin Sheikh, and Ali Jinnah, students of Dhaka Polytechnic Institute, were killed in a crossfire by RAB. On 22 October, F. M. Masum, a reporter of the New Age, was beaten after he hesitated to open the door for plainclothes RAB officers who were assaulting his landlord's wife. The officers had said he deserved to beaten for working for Nurul Kabir, editor of the New Age. Bangladesh Air Force Officer Anisur Rahman, on deputation to RAB, was found guilty of torture by RAB's own internal investigation; he was sent back to the air force and no further action was taken. RAB-1 led by Flight Lieutenant Raihan Asgar Khan killed Kaiser Mahmud Bappi in a crossfire. On 13 November, Lutfar Rahman Khalashi, and Khairul Huq Khalashi, two brothers and businessmen, were detained by RAB from Narayanganj District. Their family organized a press conference and protest asking they not be killed in a crossfire. They were killed in a crossfire on 16 November. Bangladesh High Court expressed concern over the death of the two brothers.

On 3 February, Mohiuddin Arif, a technician at Apollo Hospital Dhaka was detained and tortured in custody by RAB. He later died from his injuries. Azad Hussein Pappu, and Abdus Sattar were detained on 27 February and killed the next in a crossfire by RAB on 28 February 2010. On 22 March 2010, Bangladesh Police stopped a photo exhibition on deaths by RAB at Drik Picture Library by Shahidul Alam.

Mohammad Rafiqul Islam, a salesman and member of extremist Allah-r Dol, was forcible disappeared by RAB in February. RAB detained the Asian Human Rights Commission representative, William Gomes, and tortured him at their headquarters on 21 May 2011. Limon Hossain, a 16 year old student of Jhalakati College, was shot by RAB and had to have his leg amputated on 23 March 2011. Hossain was assulted by informants of RAB on 20 August 2012. Rasal Ahmed Bhutto, was detained on 3 March and killed in a crossfire a week later.

On 5 March 2012, RAB told Mohammad Imam Hassan's family members that they rescued him and demanded a bribe for his release. Despite a bribe being paid, he has not been seen since then.

On 11 May 2013, Mohammad Fokhrul Islam, a businessman, was the victim of enforced disappearance by RAB. His family members were warned by RAB with enforced disappearance not to talk about the issue. On 27 November 2013, Saiful Islam Hiru, former Bangladesh Nationalist Party member of parliament, and Mohammad Humayun Kabir Parvez, Bangladesh Nationalist Party politician, disappeared after being detained by RAB led by Lieutenant Colonel Tareque Sayeed. RAB was involved in the enforced disappearance of Adnan Chowdhury, Bangladesh Nationalist Party politician, on 5 December. The police refused to take a case from Chowdhury's father which mentioned RAB.

In Narayganj, rogue RAB-11 officers led by Lieutenant Colonel Tareque Sayeed abducted and killed seven men in April 2014.

On 10 March 2015, RAB vehicle was seen when Salahuddin Ahmed, Bangladesh Nationalist Party, leader was victim of enforced disappearance by law enforcement agencies.

In March 2017, Intelligence Wing chief Lieutenant Colonel Abul Kalam Azad was killed in a bomb blast in Sylhet while raiding an Islamic State of Iraq and the Levant hideout.

2018–2023 
In May 2018, Squadron Leader Mohammad Rezaul Haque led a RAB unit in Cox's Bazar that Killed Ekramul Haque, Tekhnaf Munificipality councilor and Awami League leader in an alleged crossfire. His death was recorded as he had called his wife and she recorded the call which disproved RAB's claims. It resulted in the United States using the Magnitsky Act against seven former and current officers of RAB; the first usage against Bangladesh.

RAB detained three business partners of Major General Tarique Ahmed Siddique, defence advisor to Prime Minister Sheikh Hasina, in January 2019. One of whom, retired Army captain Johirul Haque Khandaker, died eight months later in custody. Human Rights Watch described the detention the result of a business dispute.

A cyber unit of RAB-3 identified Ahmed Kabir Kishore, Mushtaq Ahmed, Didarul Bhuiyan, activist, and Minhaz Mannan Emon as targets for publishing cartoons critical of the government and charged under the Digital Security Act in May 2020. They had been victims of enforced disappearance before being officially detained. Ahmed died is custody where Kishore alleged they were tortured.

In 2021, Al Jazeera released a documentary called All the Prime Minister's Men in which the brother of the then Chief of Army, General Aziz Ahmed, bragged about RAB as his personal gangsters and thugs who make money for him and them through detentions.

In August 2022, Lieutenant Colonel Mohammad Ismail Hossain, air wing director, died after being injured in a helicopter crash. On 30 September, Director General of RAB, Chowdhury Abdullah Al-Mamun, was promoted and appointed Inspector General of Bangladesh Police. Chowdhury Abdullah Al-Mamun was under sanctions of the United States for human rights abuse.

Director Generals

Location
RAB also has 15 battalion size field units spread all over the country. Among them, 5 are located in the capital Dhaka. The units are located as follows:
 RAB-HQ  : Kurmitola, Dhaka
 RAB-1  : Uttara, Dhaka
 RAB-2  : Agargaon, Dhaka
 RAB-3  : Tikatuli, Dhaka
 RAB-4  : Mirpur, Dhaka
 RAB-5  : Rajshahi
 RAB-6  : Khulna
 RAB-7  : Chattogram
 RAB-8  : Barishal
 RAB-9  : Sylhet
 RAB-10 : Jatrabari, Dhaka
 RAB-11 : Narayanganj
 RAB-12 : Sirajganj, Tangail
 RAB-13 : Rangpur
 RAB-14 : Mymensingh
 RAB-15 : Cox's Bazar

Activities
Main activities and types of work done by RAB are:

Counter-Terrorism:
RAB apprehended numerous terrorism suspects during the course of their tenure.

Anti drugs:
RAB has been involved in the control of illegal substances such as ya ba, phensedyl and heroin.

Emergency help:
RAB provides immediate response for situations such as armed robbery and kidnappings.

National common or annual needs:
Many national needs are filled by RAB by providing extra duty during Eid-ul-Fitr, Puja, world Ijtema, and Akheri Munazat, among other events. They also contribute resources during elections, such as the Narayangonj City Corporation Election.

Ranks and insignia 
Because RAB is composed of officers and troops from Bangladesh Police and Bangladesh Armed Forces, it was necessary to attribute a common rank insignia to the RAB badges. Such insignia can be seen in the illustrations below.

List of Director Generals

Notable arrests
The following is a table containing details of major arrests by the RAB according to their official website:

Criticisms
Although the RAB has been successful in apprehending several high-profile terrorists, including the infamous Bangla Bhai, Human Rights Watch has accused RAB of numerous deaths, which have been attributed to crossfire. In March 2010, the battalion leader claimed 622 deaths were due to 'crossfire', while some human rights organisations claimed that more than 1,000 extrajudicial killings were the product of the battalion. Further, there have been many reports of torture in connection with the battalion's activities.

Murders 
Sixteen RAB-11 officials (sacked afterwards) including Lt Col (sacked) Tareque Sayeed, Major (sacked) Arif Hossain, and Lt Commander (sacked) Masud Rana were given the death penalty for abduction, murder, concealing the bodies, conspiracy and destroying evidence in the Narayanganj Seven Murder case. Another nine RAB-11 officials were awarded jail terms of 7 to 17 years in the same case.

Extrajudicial killings
According to Human Rights Watch, members of Rapid Action Battalion have shot and killed women and children during public protests. Rights group describe it as a "death squad."

In 2017, a reporter from Swedish Radio recorded a high-ranking RAB officer explaining how the RAB selects people to kill, and how it kills people. They kill people who they suspect of serious crimes but consider too difficult to convict in a trial or impossible to rehabilitate. He said, "If you find him - shoot and kill him, wherever he is. And then plant a weapon beside him." This officer says that people disappear this way every day, and that innocent people can disappear.

US Senators seeking sanction 
On 27 October 2020, The United States Senate Foreign Relations Committee wrote a letter to the United States Secretary of State and United States Secretary of the Treasury, urging them to impose sanctions on senior officials of the Rapid Action Battalion for human rights violations.

Framing incidents
Limon Hossain, a college student at Jamaddarhat at Rajapur Upazila in Jhalakati, was shot at by RAB personnel near his house on 23 March 2011, triggering a local and international outcry. His left leg had to be amputated as a result. The battalion filed two cases that day with the Rajapur police implicating Limon in an arms case and accusing him of obstructing police duties. The government finally decided to withdraw the cases against Limon on 9 July 2013, citing his need to return to a "healthy and normal life".

Rapid Action Battalion is accused of framing a Bangladeshi expatriate named Shamim Sikder on false charges of drug and forged currency and torturing him in custody.

Enforced disappearances

Families of the victims and witnesses blamed RAB for picking up 83 people while detective branch for 38, ‘law enforcers’ for 55, and plainclothes men for 20 others reported between January 2007 and August 2014, according to a report by human rights organization Ain-o-Shalish Kendro (ASK). The report also said that at least 70 leaders and activists of the opposition Bangladesh Nationalist Party and Jamaat-e-Islami fell victim to enforced disappearance while 37 others were activists of ruling Awami League.

On 5 February 2012 approximately at 1.00 a.m. Al Mukaddas (22), a 4th-year student of the Department of Al Fiqah, and Mohammad Waliullah (23), a Masters candidate of Dawah and Islamic Studies Department of Islamic University, were allegedly arrested and disappeared by some persons who identified themselves as RAB-4 and DB Police members from Savar. Both were members of the Islamic student organization Bangladesh Islami Chhatra Shibir and were allegedly detained by members of the RAB and the Detective Branch (DB) of the Bangladesh Police on 4 February 2012. They have not been heard from since and their whereabouts are unknown. The RAB has denied detaining the two men in a statement to a Bangladeshi newspaper. However, reports from several sources and a pattern of disappearances thought to have been conducted by RAB in recent months cast doubt on RAB's denial.

U.S. sanctions 
On 10 December 2021, the U.S. Department of the Treasury added RAB to its Specially Designated Nationals (SDN) list under GLOMAG. Six individuals associated with RAB - including its Director General, Chowdhury Abdullah Al-Mamun, former DG Benazir Ahmed, ADG Colonel KM Azad were also sanctioned. Entities on the list have their assets blocked and U.S. persons are generally prohibited from dealing with them. Bangladesh Foreign Minister AK Abdul Momen wrote an open letter to the US Secretariat of State Antony Blinken regarding RAB to reconsider those sanctions. On the others hand US Congressman and Chair of the US House Foreign Affairs Committee Gregory W Meeks has strongly supported those sanctions by the US Government and said that wholesale sanctions against Bangladesh were not necessary, but targeted sanctions were most useful.

References

74. Zulfikar Ali

Further reading

External links
 

Bangladesh Police
2004 establishments in Bangladesh
Government agencies established in 2004
Police units of Bangladesh
 
Bangladeshi intelligence agencies
Domestic intelligence agencies
Non-military counterterrorist organizations
Counterterrorism in Bangladesh
Specially Designated Nationals and Blocked Persons List
Magnitsky Act